The Hughes XH-17 "Flying Crane" was the first helicopter project for the helicopter division of Hughes Aircraft Company. The XH-17, which had a two-bladed main rotor system with a diameter of 134 feet (41 m), still holds the world record for flying with the largest rotor system.

Design and development
The XH-17 was a heavy-lift rotorcraft that was designed to lift loads in excess of 15 metric tons. To speed construction, parts of the XH-17 were scavenged from other aircraft. The front wheels came from a North American B-25 Mitchell and the rear wheels from a Douglas C-54 Skymaster. The fuel tank was a bomb bay-mounted unit from a Boeing B-29 Superfortress. The cockpit was from a Waco CG-15 military glider and the tail rotor from a Sikorsky H-19 Chickasaw was used for yaw control.

In the late 1940s, Hughes developed an interest in helicopters. In August 1947, helicopter manufacturer Kellett sold his design for the giant XH-17 Sky Crane to Hughes, who commissioned the development of the XH-17 Flying Crane research vehicle. In 1948, the XH-17 began to take shape. The giant helicopter was tested in Culver City, California over a three-year period beginning in 1952. It still holds the record for flying with the world's largest rotor system. Only one unit was built, since the aircraft was too cumbersome and inefficient to warrant further development.

The propulsion system was unusual. Two General Electric J35 turbojet engines were used, sending bleed air up through the rotor hub. The blades were hollow, and the hot compressed air traveled through the blades to tip jets where fuel was injected. In flight, the main rotor spun at a sedate 88 revolutions per minute, less than half the speed of typical helicopter rotors. Since the rotor was driven at the tips rather than the hub, little torque compensation was required, mostly due to friction in the main rotor bearing. Thus, the XH-17 had a very small tail rotor compared to its main rotor. This drive system was inefficient, limiting the test aircraft to a range of only .

Though a wooden mockup of the design was made, the program was canceled and none were built.

Specifications

See also

References

Further reading

External links

 

1950s United States helicopters
1950s United States experimental aircraft
Tipjet-powered helicopters
Aircraft first flown in 1952
H-17